Hiawassee is the county seat of Towns County, Georgia, United States. The community's population was 880 at the 2010 census. Its name is derived from the Cherokee—or perhaps Creek—word Ayuhwasi, which means meadow, (A variant spelling, "Hiwassee," is used for the local river and some other Appalachian place names.) Hiawassee is also known in the novel "Restart" by Gordon Korman.

History
A United States fur trade factory was situated here between 1807 and 1811.
Settled circa 1820, Hiawassee was designated seat of the newly formed Towns County in 1856. It was incorporated as a town in 1870 and as a city in 1916, after settlers violently removed the Cherokee communities living there prior in a night of massacre in 1776. Hiawassee was originally inhabited by predominantly Cherokee-speaking peoples, but the myth that the town was named after a Cherokee or otherwise Native American princess is false and is as mythical as the Cherokee princess herself. Hiawassee’s name is nature-based, as mentioned above.

Geography
Hiawassee is located on the Hiwassee River at  (34.949428, -83.755078).

Hiawassee is approximately 2000 feet (609 m) above sea level.

Demographics

As of the 2010 United States Census, there were 880 people living in the city. The racial makeup of the city was 95.2% White, 0.3% Black, 0.1% Native American, 1.3% Asian and 0.3% from two or more races. 2.7% were Hispanic or Latino of any race.

As of the census of 2000, there were 810 people, 355 households, and 203 families living in the town. The racial makeup of the town was 97.40% White, 0.25% African American, 0.12% Native American, 1.73% Asian, 0.37% from other races, and 0.12% from two or more races. Hispanic or Latino of any race were 1.61% of the population.

There were 355 households, out of which 14.1% had children under the age of 18 living with them, 45.6% were married couples living together, 10.1% had a female householder with no husband present, and 42.8% were non-families. 40.3% of all households were made up of individuals, and 24.2% had someone living alone who was 65 years of age or older.  The average household size was 1.86 and the average family size was 2.39.

In the town, the population was spread out, with 10.0% under the age of 18, 5.4% from 18 to 24, 13.1% from 25 to 44, 25.1% from 45 to 64, and 46.3% who were 65 years of age or older.  The median age was 62 years. For every 100 females, there were 70.5 males.  For every 100 females age 18 and over, there were 65.6 males.

The median income for a household in the town was $26,615, and the median income for a family was $31,458. Males had a median income of $28,929 versus $22,917 for females. The per capita income for the town was $19,957.  About 12.6% of families and 16.0% of the population were below the poverty line, including 28.3% of those under age 18 and 10.2% of those age 65 or over.

Government
Hiawassee has a mayor and city council in a strong mayor form of government. The current mayor, Liz Ordiales, is the first female mayor of Cuban descent in the State of Georgia.  The city council consists of 5 elected officials.

Education

Towns County School District 
The Towns County School District holds grades pre-school to grade twelve, and consists of one elementary school, a middle school and a high school. The district has 144 full-time teachers and over 2,408 students.
Towns County Elementary School
Towns County Middle School
Towns County High School

Points of interest
 Fred Hamilton Rhododendron Garden
 Georgia Mountain Fairgrounds
 Lake Chatuge

References

Towns in Towns County, Georgia
Towns in Georgia (U.S. state)
County seats in Georgia (U.S. state)
Populated places on the Hiwassee River